Strathmore (Gaelic: An Srath Mòr) is a strath in east central Scotland running from northeast to southwest between the Grampian mountains and the Sidlaws.
It is approximately 50 miles (80 km) long and 10 miles (16 km) wide. Strathmore is underlain by Old Red Sandstone but this is largely obscured by glacial till, sands and gravels deposited during the ice age. Its northeast to southwest alignment is influenced by the underlying geological structure of the area which reflects the dominant Caledonian trend of both the central lowlands and the Highlands of Scotland; its northern margin reflects the presence of the Highland Boundary Fault. Strathmore is fertile and has some of Scotland's best arable farmland, producing soft fruits and cereals.

History
The first recorded history of this region dates to Roman times when the Romans established a series of marching camps generally extending in a south to north direction to support the invasion and exploration northward.  Other early examples of history include Pictish stones found in Strathmore such as the Eassie Stone.

The title of Earl of Strathmore refers to this area, and the Earl's principal seat lies within it at Glamis Castle.

References

Glens of Scotland
Highland Boundary Fault
Landforms of Angus, Scotland
Valleys of Perth and Kinross
Forfar